The Central American Games are a multi-sport regional championships event, held quadrennial (every 4 years), typically in the first year after  Summer Olympics. The Games are open for member federations of the Central American Sports Organization (Spanish: Organización Deportiva Centroamericana) ORDECA  in Central American countries.  (in Spanish)

The Games have had an equivalent to the Olympic Flame, being ignited in Q'umarkaj, one of the ancient cultural Mayan centers located in El Quiché,  Guatemala. However, some people and organizations have criticised the games for not including the Mesoamerican ballgame, the oldest ball sport in the continent, on the sports programme.

The competition is the second multi-sport event to have the name: the Central American and Caribbean Games began life in 1926 as the Central American Games and had this moniker until it expanded its remit in 1935.

Editions

All time medal table (1997 - 2017)

Sports
Disciplines from the same sport are grouped under the same color:

 Aquatics –
 Cycling –
 Football –
 Gymnastics –
 Roller sports –
 Volleyball

†: Exhibition contest

Para Games

See also
 Central American and Caribbean Swimming Federation
 Central American and Caribbean Athletic Confederation
 Latin American Table Tennis Union
 Hispanic America
 Latin America
 Ibero-America
 Afro–Latin Americans
 Latin Americans
 Caribbean Sea
 Central_America#Demographics

References

External links
List of medal winners on Mas Goles 

 
Recurring sporting events established in 1973
Multi-sport events in North America
International sports competitions in Central America